The Transport and Industrial Workers Union is a trade union in Trinidad and Tobago.

See also
 List of trade unions

External links
 Transport and Industrial Workers Union

Trade unions in Trinidad and Tobago